A protest is an expression of objection, by words or by actions, to particular events, policies or situations.

Protest may also refer to:
 Protest (album), a 1977 album by Bunny Wailer
 Protest (EP), a 2002 EP by The Dears
 Protest (film), a 1967 Croatian film
 Protest (play), a 20th-century Czech play
 Protest!, a clandestine leaflet issued in 1942 in Poland
 Pro-Test, a British group that promoted and supported animal testing in medical research

Protest types and protest-related terms

 Counter-protest, a protest action which takes place within the proximity of an ideologically opposite protest
 Protest art, creative works produced by activists and social movements
 Protest camp, physical camps that are set up by activists
 Protest cycle, refers to the cyclical rise and fall in the social movement activity
 Protest permit, permission granted by a governmental agency for a demonstration
 Protest song, a song that is associated with a movement for social change
 Protest vote, a vote cast in an election to demonstrate dissatisfaction
 Road protest, various events
 Silent protest, an organized effort where the participants stay quiet to demonstrate disapproval
 Sea protest, that which protects a charterer or shipowner from claims of damage caused by the perils of the sea
 Street protest, another term for a demonstration (political)
 Student protest, a wide range of activities that indicate student dissatisfaction with a given political or academics issue
 Tax protester, someone who refuses to pay a tax claiming that the tax laws are unconstitutional or otherwise invalid

See also

 Protest the Hero, a Canadian progressive metal band
 Protest Records, an online record label that creates mp3 compilation albums
 Protest Warrior, a conservative political activist group
 Protestantism, the second largest form of Christianity
 Protesters against the 1649 Scottish Act of Classes
 Protested game, an objection raised by a manager in baseball
 Protestware, a form of hacktivism utilizing malware

See also
 Procession (disambiguation)